Season two of the 2013 edition of El Gran Show premiered on August 17, 2013.

This season continued with the format of last season, in the duel the couple saved is the highest score with the help of 2 extra points from the public. The modality of teams and coaches was also continued.

On November 2, 2013, model & reality TV star Gino Pesaressi and Jacqueline Alfaro were declared the winners, model & reality TV star Sheyla Rojas and Emanuel Colombo finished second, while actress Carolina Cano and Eduardo Pastrana were third.

Cast

Couples 
The 12 celebrities were presented during the final of last season. Among them returned Edith Tapia, who could not compete last season, and Luis Baca, dreamer on El Show de los sueños, becoming the first dreamer to compete as a celebrity in the history of the show. The professional dancers who returned were Jacqueline Alfaro, Angelo Cano, Vania Carbone, Emanuel Colombo, André Lecca (dreamer on season 2 of 2011), Eduardo Pastrana, Gustavo Rivera, Juan Tamayo and Kevin Ubillus.

Host and judges
Gisela Valcárcel, Aldo Díaz, Paco Bazán and Gachi Rivero returned as hosts, while Morella Petrozzi, Carlos Cacho, Phillip Butters, Pachi Valle Riestra and the VIP Jury returned as judges.

Scoring charts 

Red numbers indicate the sentenced for each week
Green numbers indicate the best steps for each week
 the couple was eliminated that week
 the couple was safe in the duel
 the couple was eliminated that week and safe with a lifeguard
 this couple withdrew from the competition
 the winning couple
 the runner-up couple
 the third-place couple

Average score chart 
This table only counts dances scored on a 40-point scale (the VIP jury scores are excluded).

Highest and lowest scoring performances 
The best and worst performances in each dance according to the judges' 40-point scale (the VIP jury scores are excluded) are as follows:

Couples' highest and lowest scoring dances 
Scores are based upon a potential 40-point maximum (the VIP jury scores are excluded).

Weekly scores 
Individual judges' scores in the charts below (given in parentheses) are listed in this order from left to right: Morella Petrozzi, Carlos Cacho, Phillip Butters, Pachi Valle Riestra, VIP Jury.

Week 1: First Dances 
The couples danced cumbia, jazz, latin pop, pachanga, reggaeton or salsa. This week, none couples were sentenced.
Running order

Week 2: Celebrity's Pick Night 
The couples performed a dance chosen by celebrities. In the challenge, it was decided that two members of each team would face each other, Maria Victoria "La Pánfila" Santana represented Team Chumbe while Vania Bludau represented Team Chechi, with Bludau being the winner, granting an extra point to each team member.
Running order

Week 3: Hip-hop & Vallenato Night 
The couples (except those sentenced) danced hip-hop or vallenato and a team dance of pachanga. In the challenge, it was decided that two members of each team would face each other, Grasse Becerra represented Team Chumbe while Sheyla Rojas represented Team Chechi, with Rojas being the winner, granting an extra point to each team member.
Running order

*The duel
Antonio & Yanilú: Eliminated (2pts)
Christian & Vania: Safe

Week 4: Cumbia & Disco Night 
The couples (except those sentenced) danced cumbia or disco and a team dance rock and roll.

Due to an injury during the rehearsals, María Victoria "La Pánfila" Santana had to withdraw the competition.
Running order

*The duel
Edith & André: Eliminated (but safe with the lifeguard)
Grasse & Angelo: Safe (2pts)

Week 5: The '90s Night 
The couples (except those sentenced) performed one unlearned dance to famous '90s songs. In the versus, the couples faced dancing jazz, while in the little train, only the celebrities faced dancing reggaetón.
Running order

*The duel
Edith & André: Safe (2pts)
Christian & Vania: Eliminated

Week 6: World Dances Night 
The couples (except those sentenced) performed the world dances and a team dance of axé. In the versus, the couples faced dancing different dance styles, while in the little train, only the celebrities faced dancing hula.
Running order

*The duel
Luis & Milagros: Safe
Grasse & Angelo: Eliminated (2pts)

Week 7: The Trio '80s Night 
The couples (except those sentenced) performed a trio ballroom dance involving another celebrity to famous '80s songs. In the versus, the couples faced dancing pachanga.
Running order

*The duel
Mónica & Gustavo: Safe (2pts)
Edith & André: Eliminated

Week 8: Salsa Night 
The couples (except those sentenced) danced salsa and a danceathon of salsa. In the versus, the couples faced dancing different dance styles.
Running order

*The duel
Vania & Juan: Safe (2pts)
Junior & Julliana: Eliminated (but safe with the lifeguard)

Week 9: Party Night 
The couples danced cumbia or tex-mex (except those sentenced) and adagio.
Running order

*The duel
Junior & Julliana: Eliminated
Luis & Milagros: Safe (2pts)

Week 10: Quarterfinals 
The couples performed a trio cha-cha-cha involving another celebrity (except those sentenced), merengue and a danceathon of cumbia.
Running order

*The duel
Mónica & Gustavo: Eliminated
Vania & Juan: Safe (2pts)

Week 11: Semifinals 
The couples performed strip dance, a fusion dance that fused two dance styles (except those sentenced) and a danceathon of salsa. In the little train, the participants faced dancing festejo or danza de tijeras.
Running order

*The duel
Vania & Juan: Safe (2pts)
Luis & Milagros: Eliminated

Week 12: Finals 
On the first part, the couples danced a favorite dance and a freestyle performed in a rotating room.

On the second part, the final three couples danced quickstep.
Running order (Part 1)

Running order (Part 2)

Dance chart 
The celebrities and professional partners will dance one of these routines for each corresponding week:
 Week 1: Cumbia, latin pop, pachanga, jazz, reggaeton or salsa (First Dances)
 Week 2: One unlearned dance (Celebrity's Pick Night)
 Week 3: Hip-Hop or vallenato & team dances (Hip-hop & Vallenato Night)
 Week 4: Cumbia or disco & team dances (Cumbia & Disco Night)
 Week 5: One unlearned dance, the versus & the little train (The '90s Night)
 Week 6: One unlearned dance, team dances, the versus & the little train (World Dances Night)
 Week 7: Trio ballroom dances & the versus (The Trio '80s Night)
 Week 8: Salsa, the danceathon & the versus (Salsa Night)
 Week 9: Cumbia or tex-mex & adagio (Party Night)
 Week 10: Trio Cha-cha-cha, merengue & the danceathon (Quarterfinals)
 Week 11: Strip dance, fusion dance, the danceathon & the little train (Semifinals)
 Week 12: Favorite dance, freestyle & Quickstep (Finals)

 Highest scoring dance
 Lowest scoring dance
 Gained bonus points for winning this dance
 Gained no bonus points for losing this dance
In Italic indicate the dances performed in the duel

Notes

References

External links 

El Gran Show
2013 Peruvian television seasons
Reality television articles with incorrect naming style